France–Luxembourg relations are the bilateral relations between the French Republic and the Grand Duchy of Luxembourg. France and Luxembourg share a land border. Both nations are members of the European Union, NATO, OECD and the United Nations.

Resident diplomatic missions 
 France has an embassy in Luxembourg City.
 Luxembourg has an embassy in Paris and a consulate-general in Strasbourg.

See also 
 Foreign relations of France 
 Foreign relations of Luxembourg 
 France–Luxembourg border

References

 
Luxembourg
France